Séamus Gibson (born 26 December 1962) is an Irish former hurler. At club level he played with Kilruane MacDonaghs and was also a member of the Tipperary senior hurling team.

Career

Gibson first played hurling at juvenile and underage levels with the Kilruane MacDonaghs club. He eventually progressed onto the club's senior team and was at left corner-back on the Kilruane MacDonaghs team that won the All-Ireland Club Championship title in 1986.

At inter-county level, Gibson never played at minor or under-21 levels, however, his performances at club level earned a call-up to the Tipperary senior hurling team in 1986. He claimed his first inter-county silverware after giving a man of the match display in the 1987 Munster final replay defeat of Cork. Gibson added a National Hurling League title to collection in 1988 before winning a second successive Munster SHC medal. He was an unused substitute when Tipperary were beaten by Galway in the 1988 All-Ireland final.

Honours

Kilruane MacDonaghs
All-Ireland Senior Club Hurling Championship: 1986
Munster Senior Club Hurling Championship: 1985
Tipperary Senior Hurling Championship: 1985

Tipperary
Munster Senior Hurling Championship: 1987, 1988
National Hurling League: 1987-88

References

External link

 Séamus Gibson player profile

1962 births
Living people
Kilruane MacDonaghs hurlers
Tipperary inter-county hurlers